Norfolk Street runs between Marine Terrace and South Terrace in Fremantle, Western Australia.

In the late nineteenth and early twentieth centuries, it was a street of ill health, slum conditions  and criminality. In June 1904, footballer James Gullan was residing at 18 Norfolk Street, and while there he drank some boiler fluid by accident thinking it was castor oil, resulting in his death.

In 1960 the Western Australian Wool Buyers & Exporters Association moved from their address in Perth to the Wool Exchange building at 5 Norfolk Street.

In 1997 steps were taken to heritage list the buildings at 26-27 Norfolk Street.

Intersections

Notes

Streets in Fremantle